Unmarried Daughters (German: Ledige Töchter) is a 1926 German silent film directed by Carl Boese and starring Jenny Jugo, Charlotte Ander and Ida Wüst.

The film's sets were designed by the art director Oscar Werndorff.

Cast
 Jenny Jugo as Eva Munk  
 Charlotte Ander as Mela Munk  
 Ida Wüst as Frau Munk  
 Ernő Verebes as Heidemann  
 Gyula Szőreghy as Renz - ein Möbelhändler 
 Karl Falkenberg as Hans Graf  
 Kurt Vespermann as Stichelmann - ein Maler  
 Fritz Spira as Herr Munk  
 Livio Pavanelli as Foerster  
 Lotte Lorring as Frau Stichelmann  
 Trude Lehmann as Anna, Hausmädchen bei Munks

References

Bibliography
 Parish, Robert. Film Actors Guide. Scarecrow Press, 1977.

External links

1926 films
Films of the Weimar Republic
Films directed by Carl Boese
German silent feature films
German black-and-white films
Phoebus Film films